The seventh generation of the BMW 5 Series consists of the BMW G30 (sedan version) and BMW G31 (wagon version, marketed as 'Touring') executive cars. The G30/G31 has been produced since 2016 by the German automaker BMW and is often collectively referred to as the G30. It was officially announced on 12 October 2016 and sales began in February 2017.

The fastback 5 Series Gran Turismo model from the previous generation is no longer part of the 5 Series model range, and has been moved to the 6 Series Gran Turismo nameplate. A long-wheelbase sedan version (model code G38) is sold in China.

On 27 May 2020, a facelifted 5 Series was unveiled. Although the 2021 BMW 5 Series is 1.2 inches longer than the 2020 model, many of the vehicle's other dimensions remain unchanged despite the styling redesign.

In 2023, the G30 5 Series is expected to be phased out in favor of the G60 5 Series.

Development and launch 

The BMW Head of Design during the development of the G30 was Karim Habib. Interior design was led by Daniel Mayerle.

The 5 Series saloon was unveiled on 12 October 2016 before making its public debut in January 2017 at the North American International Auto Show (NAIAS) in Detroit.

BMW created The Escape, a short action film featuring a 540i M Sport, to promote the G30 5 Series. The Escape was released online on 23 October 2016.

The 5 Series Touring was unveiled in February 2017 before making its public debut in March at the Geneva Motor Show.

The 5 Series long-wheelbase model debuted in April 2017 at the Shanghai Motor Show. Its wheelbase is  longer than that of the normal 5 Series saloon and is exclusively sold in China.

Body styles

Specifications

Platform 
The G30 5 Series utilises BMW's modular Cluster Architecture (CLAR) platform first introduced in the 7 Series (G11). The 5 Series' chassis is made from a mixture of different grades of steel and aluminium.

Much of the 5 Series' body panels are constructed of aluminium, including the bonnet, boot lid, roof and doors.

Suspension and steering 
The 5 Series uses double-wishbone front suspension and 5-link rear suspension while Touring models feature self-levelling rear air suspension. Active anti-roll bars (named "Dynamic Drive") are optional equipment.

All versions of the 5 Series use rack and pinion steering with electric power assistance. "Integral Active Steering" is an option on some models; and combines electromechanical four-wheel steering and a variable-ratio steering rack.

Powertrain 
The 5 Series is offered with a range of turbocharged petrol and diesel engines. It is also offered as a plug-in hybrid.

Up until 2018, 520d models were fitted as standard with a 6-speed manual transmission, while the ZF 8HP 8-speed automatic transmission is optional. All other models, including the 520d xDrive, are exclusively available with the ZF automatic transmission.

BMW's xDrive all-wheel drive system is optional on some base models and is standard fitment on top-of-the-line models.

Equipment 
Compared with its F10 predecessor, the G30 includes an updated BMW iDrive system with a higher resolution 10.25-inch display, a new heads-up display that covers 70% more area as well as selective anti-dazzle high beam headlights with a range of up to 500 metres. The 5 Series is also available with gesture control, new multi-contour massage seats, and a Driving Assistant Plus package that features lane departure warning, adaptive cruise control, a lane centralizing and vehicle following system and a collision warning system. 520-545 models with the M Sport trim and M550 models can be fitted with M Performance Parts. These include a splitter, side skirts, rims, carbon fibre mirrors and a carbon fibre spoiler.

At launch, the G30 is available in two equipment lines: Luxury Line and Sport Line, with the M Sport models becoming available in March 2017. The main differences of these lines are color availability (for example, the M Sport models have Carbon Black metallic instead of Jet Black), wheel designs, as well as exterior and interior stylings. The Sport Line has been discontinued during the 2021 facelift.

Laser Headlights (LCI only)

BMW laserlight headlights are high-beam technology that not only delivers a brighter beam but adapts to the environment. Laser headlights function by using three small blue lasers pointed at a set of mirrors in the front of the headlight system. The mirrors focus the laser light into a lens filled with yellow phosphorus. Yellow phosphorus when excited by the blue laser emits an intense white light.

Luxury Line

In the Luxury Line, the car carries a classic luxury look with high-gloss chrome finish on exterior elements like the Air Breather vent, the radiator grille, the lower air intakes and the side windows surrounds. Inside, leather upholstery is standard, while the instrument panel is trimmed in Sensatec leatherette as standard. The dashboard as well as the door cards are trimmed in "Ridge" fine-wood finish as standard with other wood finishes available as an option. Standard wheels are 18-inch W-spoke or 19-inch multi-spoke wheels.

Sport Line

In the Sport Line, the sporty character of the car is emphasized with high-gloss black finish on the Air Breather vent, the radiator grille slats, the lower air intake and side windows surrounds. Inside, combination cloth/leather upholstery is standard, with leather available as an option. The dashboard and door cards are trimmed in high-gloss Black with Pearl Chrome accents with other trims available as an option. Standard wheels are 18-inch 10 double-spoke or 19-inch V-spoke wheels. This line was discontinued after the June 2020 facelift for model year 2021.

M Sport Package

The M Sport Package has been available for order since March 2017. In addition to the standard color palette (with the exception of Jet Black and Glacier Silver), the M Sport Package includes an exclusive color option: Carbon Black metallic. The front and rear apron styling are unique to the M Sport models, while the suspension is lowered compared the standard setup. Optionally available for the M Sport Package is the M Sport brakes with blue-painted calipers. On the interior, front sport seats in combination cloth/Alcantara is fitted as standard, with leather and comfort front seats available as optional equipment. Another unique feature to the M Sport models is the M Sport multifunction leather steering wheel. Standard wheels include 18-inch 5 double-spoke wheels or 19-inch 10 double-spoke wheels.

Engines

Petrol

Diesel

Special models

530e iPerformance 

The 530e iPerformance is a plug-in hybrid variant of the 5 Series sedan. At launch, the 530e had a claimed all-electric range of  under the New European Driving Cycle. The electric motor was powered by a 9.2 kWh lithium-ion battery beneath the rear seats.

With the 530e, BMW also began an experimental wireless charging program. Testing was originally limited to Germany, but expanded other markets such as California. The system uses a 3.2 kW wireless charging pad that the car could drive over to charge the lithium-ion battery pack.

For the 2020 model year, BMW increased the lithium-ion battery capacity by about 30% to 12.0 kWh with 10.8 kWh usable. With the increase in battery size, the EPA estimated all-electric range increased to 21 miles for the rear-wheel drive version and 19 miles for the xDrive version.

The 530e iPerformance is offered in both rear-wheel drive and all-wheel drive (xDrive) variants. 
Preordered 530e LCI models come without the hybrid blue inserts for the BMW logos and edrive badges on the sides, making them a rare spec.

545e xDrive 
In December 2020, for the 2021 model year, BMW released the 545e xDrive, a more powerful plug-in variant. As opposed to the turbocharged inline-four engine in the 530e, the 545e xDrive uses a more powerful turbocharged inline-six engine paired with an electric motor. Total power output is 290 kW / 394 hp and it accelerates from 0 to 100 km/h in 4.6 seconds. Like the 530e, it uses a 12.0 kWh lithium-ion battery pack. Preordered 545e models come without the hybrid blue inserts for the BMW logos and edrive badges on the sides, making them a rare spec.

Alpina

B5 Bi-Turbo 

The Alpina B5 was introduced at the 2017 Geneva Motor Show in all-wheel drive only Saloon and Touring variants. Based on the N63B44O2 V8, it has uprated pistons, new twin-scroll Garrett turbochargers and new spark plugs by NGK.

D5 S 

The Alpina D5 S debuted at the 2017 Frankfurt Motor Show in all-wheel drive only sedan and Touring variants. The D5 S uses a modified 3.0-liter B57D30 diesel inline-six engine. Alpina claims it is the fastest diesel-powered production car in the world.

M5 

The M5, based on the 5 Series (known internally as F90) was announced on 21 August 2017 alongside the Need for Speed Payback video game followed by a public reveal at the Frankfurt Motor Show in September 2017. The M5 was initially offered in a "First Edition" trim that adds a numbered plaque, 20-inch wheels, matte red paint and white leather upholstery. A competition package for the M5 was announced on 9 May 2018. Deliveries of the M5 Competition began in September 2018.

Facelift 

The G30 5 Series underwent a facelift and reveal in May 2020 (also called Life Cycle Impulse) in BMW Driving Center, South Korea. It was planned to be revealed at the 2020 Busan Motor Show, but was delayed due to its cancellation for the COVID-19 pandemic in South Korea. Exterior changes include redesigned front and rear bumper along with new headlights and taillights and a sharper kidney grille design. The daytime running lights have been redesigned, now having a simplified L shape instead of the octagonal shape of the pre-facelift model, making the headlights slimmer. Adaptive LED headlights (previously a cost option) are fitted as standard (in some markets) with buyers having the option to specify the car with matrix LED or laser headlamps. The front bumper is designed to be more angular with the standard models featuring triangular corner air inlets flanking the center inlet, and the M Sport models getting larger intakes and a U-shaped contour leading into the headlights, similar to the 3 Series.

At the rear, the taillights get the same L-shaped design as the headlights with the former getting 3D lenses and C-Shaped graphics which integrate the main lighting and brake light modules. A twin-pipe exhaust system with trapezoidal outlets is standard on all models with the base models housing them in grey surrounds while the M Sport models get more prominent contours for the exhaust outlets.

Newly added options include 20-inch two-tone aerodynamic wheels and new exterior colours which include Phytonic Blue, Tanzanite Blue, Bernina Grey, and Aventurine Red. The M Sport models also have the option of red brake calipers aside from the standard blue ones. A M Sport Donnington Edition would be available at launch which would be limited to 1,000 units.

On the interior, the basic dashboard design is retained with the biggest highlight being the new touchscreen infotainment system featuring the BMW iDrive 7.0 having over-the-air updates, Personal Assistant Voice Control, integrated Apple Car Play and Android Auto and BMW maps, which is a cloud-based navigation system featuring real-time traffic updates and an improved search function. The infotainment screen measures 10.25-inch as standard but with the BMW Live Cockpit Professional system (which is standard in some markets), measures 12.3-inches. The 5 Series now features the Parking assist system shared with the 3 Series, it has a Reversing Assistant function that enables the car to backtrack where it came from. On top of this, the Parking Assistant Professional incorporates the new Drive Recorder function that can record up to 40 seconds of footage using various cameras.

The engine range has been revamped and features twin-turbocharging for all diesel engines along with optimized direct injection for petrol engines. The hybrid models get a 48-volt system which adds  to the total engine output. The M550i gets the same engine from the M850i.

Production 
Production of the G30 occurs at the BMW Group Plant Dingolfing in Germany, and began in November 2016. All 5 Series long-wheelbase production takes place at BMW Brilliance's factory in the Dadong district of Shenyang, China.

In addition, from March 2017, contract manufacturer Magna Steyr began building 5 Series saloons at its factory in Graz, Austria.

Complete knock down (CKD) production of the 5 Series takes place in the following locations:
 6 October City, Egypt
 Chennai, India
 Jakarta, Indonesia
 Kulim, Malaysia
 Kaliningrad, Russia
 Rayong, Thailand (BMW Manufacturing (Thailand))
In November 2021 the M550i xDrive and 540i xDrive had an issue where the traction control interferes with acceleration fixed by over the air updates.

Safety

Euro NCAP 
The 2017 5 Series received five stars overall in its Euro NCAP test.

IIHS 
The G30 5 Series is an Insurance Institute for Highway Safety (IIHS) "Top Safety Pick+" for 2017. The Top Safety Pick+ designation is awarded to cars with 'good' IIHS ratings in the small overlap front, moderate overlap front, side, roof strength, and head restraint tests; 'acceptable' or 'good' headlights; and for having an option for a front crash prevention system with an 'advanced' or 'superior' rating.

Awards 
 2017 What Car?s 'Car of the Year' and 'Best Luxury Car'.
2017 iF product design 'Automobiles/Product Gold Award'
 2017 AutoExpress Executive Car of the Year
 2017 EyesOnDesign Award for Best Designed User Experience

Notes

References 

5 Series (G30)
G30
Plug-in hybrid vehicles
Euro NCAP executive cars
Cars introduced in 2017
2020s cars